The Sarajevo Youth Film Festival, also known as OFF Sarajevo, is an annual film festival held in Sarajevo, Bosnia and Herzegovina. It is held in September and showcases an extensive variety of feature, animated and short films from around the world. The main focus of the festival is on promoting young film directors and producers, student films and youth-themed films. OFF Sarajevo is considered to be one of the premium student film festivals in the Balkans.

History
The festival was established by film professionals from Bosnia and Herzegovina with the goal of giving younger filmmakers from the Former Yugoslavia a wider platform to promote their work. It was quickly internationalized even further, bringing in authors from all of Europe, North America and Asia. The first edition of the festival was organized from 9 to 13 September 2008. Most of the events were of open-air type. Traditionally, Žuta tabija and the House of the Military in downtown Sarajevo were used as primary venues for the event. However, since OFF Sarajevo 2018, all of the events are held in Cinema City cinema near BBI shopping center. On average 30 authors from 11 different countries are programmed per edition, with over 50,000 visitors each year. The average age of festival employees is 22, while the management is headed by Kenan Musić. The main feature film competition program is called Made for Open Air.

Sections 
Main Program: Short meter, short feature film 

Main program is the selection of a short feature film. Within this selection are young film professionals with their short films created in their own production or production of their film schools. The Short Meter Selection at the 11th edition of Youth Film Festival Sarajevo will present a 20 shorts.

Competition Program: Creative, art and experimental film

One of the competition selections of the festival is the selection of a short experimental, art and creative film. This selection in 2019 will present 5 films.

Competition Program: OFF Generation

"OFF Generation" is the old program of the Festival but with a new name. As in previous years, this program will present 5 films that are designed for the young generation of 15–26 years old and directed by former or recent film academy students.

Special Screenings: Family movies

One of the goals of the Youth Film Festival Sarajevo, from the outset, was to create unique cinema locations and special atmosphere during screenings at open-air cinemas. For this reason, OFF continues with projections of 5 family, feature films that will be screened as part of the Open Cinema at Žuto tabija, OS BiH and as part of the new open air venue of the festival in the center of Sarajevo - OFF Drive in cinema.

Awards 2017 
Best short: Fabijan - Croatia, Director: Lovro Mrđen, Award: 1.000,00, TV Premiere, Best Documentary Film: Wedding Package - Director: Omer Mirac Turc, Award: 1.000,00, TV Premiere, Best Male Role: Filip Križar, Film "Fabijan" - Croatia, Prize: 500,00  KM, Best Female Role: Cathrine Salee - Film "Marlon" - France, Prize: 500,00  KM

References

External links
 Official website

Recurring events established in 2008
September events
Tourist attractions in Sarajevo
Annual events in Bosnia and Herzegovina
Film festivals in Sarajevo
2008 establishments in Bosnia and Herzegovina